The 1906 Delaware football team represented Delaware College—now known as the University of Delaware–as an independent during the 1906 college football season. Led by Clarence A. Short in his second and final year as head coach, Delaware compiled a record of 5–1.

Schedule

References

Delaware
Delaware Fightin' Blue Hens football seasons
Delaware football